Vemanpalle is a village in Mancherial district of the Indian state of Telangana. It is located in Vemanpalle mandal of Mancherial revenue division.

Geography

References

External links
Adilabad Mandals and their Gram Panchayats (map)

Villages in Mancherial district
Mandal headquarters in Mancherial district